Pola de Allande is a town and a parish in Allande, a municipality within the province and autonomous community of Asturias, in northern Spain. It is surrounded by the Cantabrian mountains. It is the capital of the parish. The town was founded between 1262 and 1268. The Nison River runs through the middle of the town, known for its trout while now fishing is banned there. 

The parish is also home to a 15th-century castle, the Palace of Cienfuegos de Peñalba, based on a hill above the town, which has been a symbol for the city for some time.

The town is located on the Camino Primitvo path of the Camino de Santiago.

Villages

The villages of the parish include:  

Caleyo
Cereceda (Zreiceda)
Cimadevilla (Cimavilla)
Colobredo (Colobreo)
El Mazo
Ferroy (Ferrói)
Fresnedo (Fresnéu)
La Reigada
La Roza
Peñablanca (Penablanca)
Peñaseita (Penaseita)
Pola de Allande (La Puela)
Valbona
Villafrontú
Villasonte

References

Parishes in Allande